Stefano ("Bibi") Battistelli (born 6 March 1970 in Rome) is a former backstroke and medley swimmer from Italy.

Biography
He competed in two consecutive Summer Olympics (1988 and 1992), and won a bronze medal at each appearance. The bronze in Seoul was the first Olympic medal for a male Italian swimmer.

See also
Italy national swimming team - Multiple medalists

External links

1970 births
Living people
Swimmers from Rome
Olympic swimmers of Italy
Swimmers at the 1988 Summer Olympics
Swimmers at the 1992 Summer Olympics
Italian male swimmers
Olympic bronze medalists for Italy
Olympic bronze medalists in swimming
Italian male freestyle swimmers
World Aquatics Championships medalists in swimming
European Aquatics Championships medalists in swimming
Medalists at the 1992 Summer Olympics
Medalists at the 1988 Summer Olympics
Mediterranean Games gold medalists for Italy
Swimmers at the 1987 Mediterranean Games
Universiade medalists in swimming
Mediterranean Games medalists in swimming
Universiade bronze medalists for Italy
Medalists at the 1997 Summer Universiade
20th-century Italian people